Iselin Løken Solheim (born 20 June 1990), known simply as Iselin, is a Norwegian singer-songwriter. She is well known for her vocals on Alan Walker's singles "Faded" and "Sing Me to Sleep" and Gryffin's single "Just for a Moment". She started her music career in the year 2007. Her songs are mainly in English.

Career
Iselin Løken Solheim was born in Naustdal, located in Sogn og Fjordane, Norway and started singing at a young age. In 2007 she participated in the Norwegian version of Pop Idol named Idol - Jakten på en superstjerne, where she placed in the top 40. In 2009, after high school she attended kiringssal Folkehøgskule in Sandefjord, where she mainly studied music and then began writing her own songs. In 2010, she attended The Institute for Performing Arts in Liverpool, where she studied Popularize Music & Sound Technology. Here she developed as an artist and performer, starting with new projects and cultivating her own sounds.

After returning to Norway from the United Kingdom, Bisi Music signed her immediately. She then released her well-received debut single "What's Happening", which received wide airplay and was selected Song of the Week for the national radio station Radio Norge. At that time Solheim met Jesper Borgen together with her former manager Hilde Wahl from Bisi Music to test out a new partnership. They later on wrote the text, melody and produced the song "The Wizard of Us" and "Oracle" together in 2013. Her next single "Giants" was released in 2015.

In late 2015 and early 2016, she lent uncredited vocals on Alan Walker's songs "Faded" and "Sing Me to Sleep".

In 2018, Solheim released the solo track "Bathtub". She says of the song:

She then released her next single "Lost" in September and an acoustic version in October 2018. "Anyone Out There" was released in February 2019.

Felix Cartal's single "Walking By" (2018), Gryffin's single "Just for a Moment" (2018) and 3LAU & Justin Caruso's single "Better With You" (2019) all featured Solheim.

Solheim has also co-written songs for, among others, R3hab, Matoma, SKAAR, Inna, Broiler, James Carter, and Martin Tungevaag.

Discography

Singles

As lead artist

As featured artist

Other songs

Production credits

Music videos

References

1990 births
Living people
Norwegian pop singers
English-language singers from Norway
People from Naustdal
21st-century Norwegian singers
21st-century Norwegian women singers